In the 1970s it was normal procedure that the fastest school rowing eight would be selected to row in the World Junior Championships as a full school unit. This was confirmed by the provisionally selected crew winning the Junior Eights at the National Rowing Championships of Great Britain.

As an experiment in 1976 it was decided to create for the first time an eight composed of different clubs and schools to compete against the provisionally selected eight Emanuel School at the National Championships. This new crew was referred to as the "composite eight".

In order to select the eight, coxless pairs time trials were held at Molesey and the fastest five pairs were taken to select the final eight members of the crew based on technique. There were two weeks available for preparation.

At the National Championships Emanuel School won, but by an unconvincing margin for an established crew against a crew that had not raced before. The selectors decided on a second race.

The composite eight won the second race. The selectors decided that a third race should take place the following day. It was claimed that the headwind benefited the newer composite eight crew who were heavier. Therefore, the third race of 1,500 metres was rowed at Holme Pierrepont, Nottingham in the opposite direction in a tailwind. It was possible to race the course "backwards" as the National Championships had finished the day before. The composite eight again won, this time by 1/3 length.

The first Junior composite eight raced at Villach, Austria, 1976. After this year all GB Junior eights were composites of schools and clubs. After 1982 all GB Junior crews  were composite and selected as result of extensive national junior squad trials, overseen by an ARA appointed International chief Junior Coach .

Origins of the Concept 

The concept of the junior composite system was taken from a conversation with a German rowing coach in Montreal, Quebec, Canada in 1975.

External links 
Natchamps website Winners Book 1976 showing Emanuel School as winners of the National Championships
Natchamps website Winners Book 1977 showing the second junior composite eight with 6 different schools / clubs winning at the National Championships

Rowing in the United Kingdom